Important Cultural Property may refer to:

 Important Cultural Property (Japan)
 Intangible Cultural Property (South Korea) 
 Important Cultural Property (Philippines)

See also 
 Cultural property
 Hague Convention for the Protection of Cultural Property in the Event of Armed Conflict